Marlies Krämer is a feminist and politician (born 1937 in Illingen). In 1996 she was a force in initiating the renaming of low-pressure areas in Germany, from formerly female names to a new naming system. Since 1998 these have been given female names one year and the following year male names are used instead.

After WW2 she started an apprenticeship in retailing. In 1958 she married. She gave birth to 4 children. Her husband died in 1972. From 1987 until 1994 she became a member of the city council of Sulzbach. In the 1990s when her ID Card needed to be extended she was not willing to accept this identity document, which addressed her as Inhaber (in German a male title indicating the holder of the card) instead of Inhaberin (the female form of the title).

In 2018 she went to court (Federal Court of Justice or BGH) with the savings bank Sparkasse over how to address a bank account holder properly. Krämer shared the opinion that she does not want to be addressed as a Kunde, because it is a form of address that is not suitable for a female customer. The German language differentiates between a male variant of customer with Kunde and a female one, Kundin.
The court rejected her claim and she lost the case. The ruling (Accession number: VI ZR 143/17) stated, the current practice is not gender discrimination.

On 8 March 2020 Marlies Krämer received the Women's Award of the state Rhineland Palatinate in Mainz.

Published works 
 Wenn politische Frauen kuren ... : Erfahrungen und Tips von A bis Z (1992), with Dolly Hüther. Logos-Verlag (Publisher) 
 Supermarkt Frühlingswiese: Eine Umweltgeschichte (2001). Conte-Verlag (Publisher) 
 Wirbel im Blätterwald : gesammelte Wortmeldungen (2003). Conte-Verlag (Publisher)

References 

1937 births
Living people
20th-century German women politicians
German city councillors